Saghar may refer to:

 Saghar District, in Afghanistan
 Saghar, Afghanistan, a village
 Saghar, Pakistan, a village in Punjab, Pakistan

People with the name 
 Saghar Nizami (1905–1983), Indian poet
 Saghar Siddiqui (1928–1974), Pakistani poet
 Riaz ur Rehman Saghar (1941–2013), Pakistani poet and film song lyricist